The 21 cm Mörser 16 (21 cm Mrs 16), or 21 cm Lange Mörser M 16/L14.5, was a heavy howitzer used by Germany in World War I and World War II (although classified as a mortar (Mörser) by the German military).

History
It was based on the earlier 21 cm Mörser 10 but had a longer barrel, a gun shield and other refinements. Originally, it broke down into two loads for transport but the Germans rebuilt surviving guns during the 1930s with rubber-rimmed steel wheels to allow for motor traction in one piece with a limber under the trail and generally removed the gun shield.

Combat service

They remained in first-line use with the Germans until replaced by the 21 cm Mörser 18 by about 1940. Afterwards, they were used for training, although some equipped units in secondary theaters.

Sweden bought a dozen weapons in 1918 from the Germans and they remained in service until 1950. Finland bought four of these from Sweden during the Winter War, although they did not participate in the war because the Finns lacked vehicles strong enough to tow their great weight to the front. This had been rectified before the Continuation War and the Finns equipped the 10th Separate Super-Heavy Artillery Battery with them for the duration of the war. The Swedes had their own concrete-piercing shells, called 210 tkrv 51/65-ps R-/33 by the Finnish army, weighing , which had dispersion problems as the Finns found out. The weapons were put into reserve after the war and remained there until the late 1960s before being discarded.

Gallery

See also

Weapons of comparable role, performance and era
 220 mm TR mle 1915/1916 – French equivalent
 BL 8 inch Howitzer Mk VI – VIII – British equivalent firing slightly lighter shell

References

Further reading

External links

 Video clips on YouTube
 21 cm Mörser 10/16 on Landships
 the Mörser 16 on Jägerplatoon
 List and pictures of World War I surviving 21cm Morsers 16

World War I howitzers
World War II artillery of Germany
World War I artillery of Germany
210 mm artillery